Postcodes in New Zealand consist of four digits, the first two of which specify the area, the third the type of delivery (street, PO Box, Private Bag, or Rural delivery), and the last the specific lobby, RD (rural delivery) number, or suburb. The present postcode system was introduced in New Zealand in June 2006, which, unlike the previous system, applies to all items of mail with effect from June 2008. In October 2008, New Zealand Post launched a 'remember your postcode' campaign, offering a NZ$10,000 prize for remembering a postcode.

This replaced a previous system, introduced in 1977, in which New Zealand Post did not require individual items of mail to include the postcode in the address. Optical character recognition (OCR) enabled automated sorting machines to scan entire addresses, rather than just postcodes, as was the case with older machines. This was very similar to the case in Ireland. OCR technology was introduced in 1992; when the first of seven OCR machines were installed in Auckland, Wellington and Christchurch Mail Centres, most mail was sorted manually.

Allocation

There are 1856 postcodes, each of which may serve up to 10,000 individual locations. Postcodes are generally allocated north to south.

 00 – unused
 01 – Whangarei, Marsden Point, Ngunguru
 02 – Kawakawa, Kerikeri, Moerewa, Paihia, Russell
 03 – Dargaville
 04 – Kaikohe, Kaitaia
 05 – Mangawhai, Waipu
 06 – North Shore, West Auckland (urban); West Auckland (PO box); south-western Central Auckland
 07 – North Shore, West Auckland (rural); North Shore (PO Box)
 08 – Helensville, Kumeu
 09 – Hibiscus Coast, Warkworth, Wellsford, Snells Beach; Great Barrier Island
 10 – Central Auckland, Waiheke Island (urban), Rakino Island
 11 – Central Auckland (PO box, central)
 12 – Central Auckland (PO box, western bays)
 13 – Central Auckland (PO box, inner south-west)
 14 – Central Auckland (PO box, outer south-west)
 15 – Central Auckland (PO box, inner south-east)
 16 – Central Auckland (PO box, outer-south-east)
 17 – Central Auckland (PO box, eastern bays)
 18 – Waiheke Island (PO box)
 19 – Waiheke Island (rural)
 20  – South Auckland (urban, north and east)
 21  – South Auckland, Pukekohe, Tuakau, Waiuku (urban, south); South Auckland (PO box, north and east)
 22  – South Auckland (PO box, south)
 23  – Pukekohe, Tuakau, Waiuku (PO box)
 24 – Pokeno, Mercer, Mangatawhiri
 25 – South Auckland (rural)
 26 – Pukekohe, Tuakau, Waiuku (rural)
 27 – unused
 28 – unused
 29 – unused
 30 – Rotorua, Murupara
 31 – Tauranga, Whakatane, Edgecumbe, Katikati, Kawerau, Opotiki, Te Puke, Matakana Island
 32 – Hamilton, Raglan
 33 – Taupo, Morrinsville, Te Aroha, Turangi
 34 – Cambridge, Tokoroa, Mangakino, Matamata, Putaruru
 35 – Coromandel, Ngatea, Tairua, Thames, Whitianga
 36 – Paeroa, Waihi, Waihi Beach, Whangamata
 37 – Huntly, Ngāruawāhia, Te Kauwhata
 38 – Te Awamutu
 39 – Otorohanga, Taumarunui, Te Kuiti
 40 – Gisborne, Ruatoria
 41 – Hastings, Napier, Wairoa
 42 – Waipawa, Waipukurau
 43 – New Plymouth, Eltham, Inglewood, Stratford, Waitara
 44 – Palmerston North
 45 – Whanganui, Patea
 46 – Hawera, Ohakune, Opunake, Raetihi
 47 – Feilding, Marton, Taihape
 48 – Ashhurst, Bulls, Foxton, Shannon, Waiouru
 49 – Dannevirke, Pahiatua, Woodville
 50 – Lower Hutt, Upper Hutt, Kapiti, Porirua, Tawa (urban); Lower Hutt (PO Box).
 51 – Upper Hutt (PO Box)
 52 – Kapiti, Porirua (PO Box)
 53 – Kapiti, Lower Hutt, Porirua, Upper Hutt (rural)
 54 – unused
 55 – Levin, Ōtaki
 56 – unused
 57 – Carterton, Featherston, Greytown, Martinborough
 58 – Masterton
 59 – unused
 60 – Wellington (urban)
 61 – Wellington (PO box, central & west)
 62 – Wellington (PO box, south & east)
 63 – unused
 64 – Wellington (PO box, north)
 65 – unused
 66 – unused
 67 – unused
 68 – unused
 69 – Wellington (rural)
 70 – Nelson, Richmond, Brightwater, Mapua, Wakefield
 71 – Motueka, Takaka
 72 – Blenheim, Picton
 73 – Cheviot, Kaikoura, Hanmer Springs
 74 – Rangiora, Amberley, Oxford
 75 – Akaroa, Darfield
 76 – Kaiapoi, Leeston, Lincoln, Prebbleton, Rolleston
 77 – Ashburton, Methven, Rakaia
 78 – Greymouth, Hokitika, Reefton, Westport
 79 – Timaru, Geraldine, Temuka, Twizel, Waimate
 80 – Christchurch (urban); Chatham Islands
 81 – Christchurch (PO Box, central)
 82 – Christchurch (PO Box, south)
 83 – unused
 84 – Christchurch (PO Box, west)
 85 – Christchurch (PO Box, north)
 86 – Christchurch (PO Box, central-east)
 87 – unused
 88 – Christchurch (PO Box, north-east and south-east)
 89 – Christchurch (rural and PO Box, rural)
 90 – Dunedin, Mosgiel, Port Chalmers
 91 – unused
 92 – Balclutha, Milton
 93 – Queenstown, Alexandra, Arrowtown, Cromwell, Ranfurly, Wanaka
 94 – Oamaru, Palmerston
 95 – Clinton, Lawrence, Roxburgh, Tapanui
 96 – Nightcaps, Ohai, Otautau, Tuatapere; Fiordland, Te Anau
 97 – Gore, Lumsden, Mataura, Winton
 98 – Invercargill, Bluff, Edendale, Riverton, Wyndham; Stewart Island
 99 – unused

Examples 

In cities and large towns, the last two digits indicate one of the four modes of delivery, as illustrated by addresses in Palmerston North:

 Street address, in which mail is delivered directly to homes by the 'postie';

43 Vogel Street
Roslyn
Palmerston North 4414

 PO Box address, in which mail is delivered to a private box, usually at a Post Shop (formerly Post Office), for collection;

PO Box 400
Palmerston North Central
Palmerston North 4440

 Private Bag, in which a private mail bag is delivered to an organisation such as a large company or a government department
 
Private Bag 11222
Manawatu Mail Centre
Palmerston North 4442

 Rural Delivery, used in rural areas for home deliveries.

Railway Road
RD 10
Palmerston North 4470

Previous system 
Although postcodes were first introduced in New Zealand in 1977, these were used entirely for pre-sorting large volumes of mail in bulk, similar to the Mailsort system used by Royal Mail in the United Kingdom. Consequently, postcodes were not usually seen in addresses:

New Zealand Post
Private Bag 39990
Wellington Mail Centre
Lower Hutt

Under the old system, Auckland, Wellington and Christchurch were divided into postal zones, which were incorporated into the postcode system for use in bulk mailings. For example, for the former Wellington 4:

Flat 2
173 Park Road
Johnsonville
Wellington 6004

In cities and large towns, the last two digits indicated the mode of delivery, as illustrated by addresses in Palmerston North:

Street address:

43 Vogel Street
Palmerston North 5301

Post Office Box address:

P O Box 4000
Palmerston North 5315

Private Bag address
 
Private Bag 11222
Palmerston North 5320

Rural Delivery address

Railway Road
R D 10
Palmerston North 5321

NB: Prior to the changeover, New Zealand Post also required that a space be inserted between the letters 'P' and 'O' in 'PO Box' or 'R' and 'D' in 'RD'.

Māori names 

New Zealand Post recognises Māori names for cities and towns in New Zealand; for example, the Māori Language Commission's address is:

Te Taura Whiri i te Reo Māori
Pouaka Poutāpeta 411
Te Whanganui a Tara 6140

In English, this translates as:

Māori Language Commission
PO Box 411
Wellington 6140

In spite of the considerable difference between the two languages, there was no need to add the postcode under the old system, which in this case would have been 6015.

Freepost
Mail to members of the New Zealand Parliament is delivered free of charge for individuals (organisations must pay regular rates). The cost is deducted from the Member's budget.

Rt Hon Jacinda Ardern
Prime Minister
Private Bag 18888
Parliament Buildings
Wellington 6160

Other Freepost mail includes a unique number as well as the PO Box or Private Bag number:

Freepost 112002
CARM
PO Box 913
Dunedin 9054

Third-party registered postal operators
Until recently NZ Post has had the majority of influence on Private Box rentals. But now DX Mail and Private Box provide an alternative solution for people who need a remote box address. Along with the new competitors in the marketplace NZ Post may find it difficult to keep up with the new addressing system, which is why they have set a standard for addressing mail.

References

External links 
New Zealand Post
New Post Code finder
How postcodes work

Postal addresses
New Zealand